Headgear Studio (also known as Headgear Recording Studio) was an American recording studio based in Williamsburg, Brooklyn. It was founded in 1998 by Alex Lipsen and Dan Long. In 2000, engineer Scott F. Norton joined as a partner and the studio relocated its facilities near the Brooklyn waterfront. The studio was featured in an article in Tape Op magazine in October, 2008.
Headgear first attracted attention when the Yeah Yeah Yeahs recorded their 2003 debut album, Fever to Tell, there with producer David Sitek. That album was nominated for a 2004 Grammy Award for Best Alternative Music Album. Sitek subsequently recorded with his band, TV on the Radio at Headgear and built the adjoining Stay Gold Studio in the same building. According to their Facebook page, the studio closed in 2012.

Artists who have recorded at Headgear include

 All-American Rejects (DreamWorks) with Tim O'Heir (producer/engineer)
 Ambulance LTD (TVT Records) with producer Ron Schaffer
 Andromeda
 Animal Collective
 Apache Beat
 Appleseed Cast (deep elm records) with engineer/producer John Agnello
 Au Revoir Simone
 Celebration
 Chavez
 CocoRosie (Touch and Go Records)
 Cymbals Eat Guitars
 Dinner with the Band (IFC)
 Dirty On Purpose
 Early Man
 Echosuite
 Entrance (Tigerstyle Records) with engineer/producer Chris Cody
 Everyothers with engineer/producer Tim O'Heir
 Fireworks Go Up with engineer/producer John Agnello
 Golden Triangle
 Grand Mal
 Grooms
 Heavy Trash
 Heroine Sheiks (rubric records) with engineer/producer Greg Gordon
 Hot Rod Circuit (Vagrant Records) with engineer/producer Tim O'Heir
 Inouk
 Jay Farrar with engineer/producer John Agnello 
 Jennifer O'Connor
 Keepaway
 Kevin Devine
 Lee "Scratch" Perry
 Light Asylum
 Louque (Lava Records)
 Ludlow Lions
 Massive Attack
 Meshell N'degeocello
 Miracle of 86 - (deep elm records)
 Moses Murphy
 Muckaferguson - (deep elm records)
 The Naked Hearts
 Parts and Labor
 Pela
 Phosphorescent
 Radio 4
 RaRaRiot
 Ribbons
 Sam Champion
 Sam Winch with producer Rod Sherwood
 Santigold (with producer John Hill)
 Shakira (with producer John Hill)
 Son Volt with engineer/producer John Agnello
 Tensixties
 The Boggs (Arena Rock Recording)
 The Dragons of Zynth
 The Hold Steady ( Soundtrack for Dylan Movie)
 The Infidels
 The Jealous Girlfriends with engineer/producer Dan Long
 The Knife (Remixed by David Sitek)
The List
 The National
 Tiombe Lockhart
 TV On The Radio
 Vic Thrill
 White Magic
 World Inferno Friendship Society with engineer/producer Tim O'Heir
 Yeah Yeah Yeahs
 Zach de la Rocha

References

Recording studios in New York City
Williamsburg, Brooklyn